Federal elections were held in Switzerland on 27 October 1878. The Radical Left remained the largest group in the National Council.

Electoral system
The 135 members of the National Council were elected in 48 single- and multi-member constituencies using a three-round system. Candidates had to receive a majority in the first or second round to be elected; if it went to a third round, only a plurality was required. Voters could cast as many votes as there were seats in their constituency. There was one seat for every 20,000 citizens, with seats allocated to cantons in proportion to their population.

Results

National Council 
Voter turnout was highest in Schaffhausen (where voting was compulsory) at 95.1% and lowest in Schwyz at 26.7%.

By constituency

Council of States

References

1878
1878 elections in Europe
1878 in Switzerland